The ancient borough of Tiverton in Devon, England, is governed by a Mayor and Councillors.

The historic seat of government was Tiverton Guildhall, which was demolished to make way for the surviving Tiverton Town Hall, built in 1864 by Samuel Garth, Mayor of Tiverton 1861-2, to the design of Henry Lloyd, the architect of Exeter St Davids railway station. In the Mayoralty Room is a portrait of Sir John Heathcoat, MP for Tiverton (1832–1859).

List of Mayors of Tiverton

1620: John Diamond (born 1541) of Tiverton
1655: Thomas Fowler
post 1655: Henry Newte (1609 - 1670), twice Mayor, post 1655 when he last acted as Town Clerk. 
1683: Henry Blagdon
1686-1687: Sir Hugh Acland, 5th Baronet, also MP for Tiverton
1693: John How
1703: George Davey (1690–1746), of Gotham House, Tiverton. 
before 1766: John Webber, whose residence was "during the summer of 1766 [...] burnt to the ground; but whether by accident or intention is not stated"
1714: George Thorne
1724: Nathaniel Thorne
1749: Clement Govett
1754: Oliver Peard
1767/1770: B. Dickinson
1770: Henry Osmond
1799: J. B. Cholwich 
1800: Rev. John Pitman
1801: Mr. Govett
1806: G. Cruwys 
1810: John Govett 
1814: Henry Dunsford 
1832: Thomas Cosway
1832: William Dickinson
1861-62: Samuel Garth
1863-64: William North Row
1902-03: Tom Lake (Liberal)
1952-53 & 1971 Harold Shapland
?: William Robert Trickey
1973: Eric Shapland
2016-2018 Stephen Flaws
2019-present Colin Slade

References

 Tiverton
Tiverton
Tiverton, Devon